Compton Valence is a small village and civil parish in the county of Dorset in southern England. It is sited at the head of a narrow valley, formed by a small tributary of the River Frome, and is surrounded by the hills of the Dorset Downs, which has led to it having been described as "a pocket of habitation in the downs." Dorset County Council estimate that in 2013 the population of the parish was 50.

The parish church has a 15th-century tower, but the rest of the building was rebuilt in 1838–1839 by Benjamin Ferrey. The church is a Grade II* listed building.

The locality is known to geologists for the 'Compton Valence Dome', arising from the local upcoming of the chalk strata. The core of this geological structure has been eroded to reveal the older underlying Middle Jurassic mudstones. It lies astride the Wynford Fault and is thought to arise from a complex intersection of faults in the area.

Compton Valence is known locally for its display of snowdrops, which fill the road verges in late winter.

References

External links 

Villages in Dorset